The 1874–75 season was the fourth season of competitive football by Queen's Park.

This was the second season in which Queen's Park played in their now traditional black and white hoops. Between 1874 and 1876, each player wore distinctive socks.

Scottish Cup

Queen's Park retained the Scottish Cup, winning the competition for the second time after they defeated Renton in the final.

Friendlies

Squad statistics

Source:

References

1874–75
Queen's Park
1874–75 in Scottish football